Kimberley Isaac Moyes is an Australian musician, producer, mix engineer, composer, songwriter, DJ and one half of the Sydney-based electronica duo, The Presets (with Julian Hamilton). Moyes provides synthesizers and drums, as well as engineering, production and songwriting. The Presets have released two EPs and four full-length albums (Beams, Apocalypso, Pacifica and Hi Viz). Moyes also records and performs as a solo artist under the aliases K.I.M, KIM and alongside Melbourne veteran DJ Mike Callander as one half of Zero Percent

In 2018, Moyes launched his own vinyl and digital record label with Mike Callander called "Here To Hell".

Early life and education
Born on 15 September 1976 in Sydney, New South Wales, Moyes attended the Conservatorium High School for his final school years 11 and 12, before going on to a Bachelor of Music at the Sydney Conservatorium Of Music (majoring in classical percussion).

Career

Directly after university Moyes and Hamilton performed and recorded as members of Prop, they released one full-length album and a remix compilation.

As a member of The Presets Moyes has enjoyed considerable success: 12 ARIA Nominations (of which they have won 7), APRA's Songwriters of The Year 2012, as well as many other awards for Best Live Band, Band of The Year and Album of the Year.

Outside of The Presets, Moyes has released many recordings of his own. Through Cutters records he released "System Breakdown" in 2005, followed by the 12-inch single "B.T.T.T.T.R.Y" through Bang Gang in 2006. In 2007 and 2008 he released a consecutive series of 12-inch records through Modular Recordings: "Wet'N'Wild", "Party Machini" and "Fistogram". Many of these tracks were to be featured on Selected Jerks 2001–2009, a double-disc album of original recordings and remixes throughout 8 years. Selected Jerks was preceded by a Japanese only mini-album, System Breakdown, released in 2006 via Rallye Records.

Throughout his time as The Presets, Moyes has remixed many artists, both as The Presets and under his K.I.M. or (KIM) moniker, including acts such as Kings of Leon, Sarah Blasko and Architecture in Helsinki. He has also worked extensively as a session musician and as a producer. His production credits include albums for Kirin J Callinan, Jack Ladder, Beni and DMA's.

Awards and nominations

Melbourne WebFest
 2022 Best Original Score - Phenomena

APRA Award
2009 Songwriters of the Year (shared with Julian Hamilton)

Discography

Albums

Score albums

Compilation albums

Mini-albums

EPs

Singles

Remixes

Production, Mixing, Writing and Musician credits
Aleesha Dibbs - Battalion (2023) [mixer]
Lady Jane Beach - Motorcycle (2022) [co-producer]
Aleesha Dibbs - Battalion (2022) [mixer]
Shady Nasty - CHEST HEIGHT (2022) [producer/mixer]
Kinder - Rasta (feat. Gold Fang) (2022) [co-writer/co-producer/programming]
Keli Holiday - KELI (2022) [co-writer/producer]
Mazy - Interstella (2022) [mixer]
Keli Holiday - Off My Mind (2022) [co-writer/producer]
The Presets - You Belong (2022) [co-producer/co-writer/mixer]
The Presets - NYE 2021 Midnight Fireworks Soundtrack (2022) [co-producer/co-writer/mixer]
Art vs. Science - Sweat (2021) [producer/mixer]
Lady Jane Beach - Outback (2021) [co-producer]
Moody Beach - Assembly Of The Wild EP (2021) [producer/mixer/drums/synths/co-writer]
Keli Holiday - December (2021) [producer]
Mazy - Flowers (2021) [mixer]
Moody Beach - Plastic Love (2021) [producer/mixer/drums/synths]
Keli Holiday - Song Goes On (2021) [producer]
Holy Holy - Aftergone (feat. CLEWS) (2021) [co-producer/co-writer]
DZ Deathrays - Kerosene (2021) [co-writer]
Moody Beach - The Other (2021) [producer/mixer/drums]
Keli Holiday - Where You Feel (2021) [producer]
Mazy - You Got Me (2021) [mixer]
Moody Beach - Why Not (2021) [producer/mixer/drums/synths]
Perfect Moment - Perfect Moment EP (2020) [producer/co-writer]
Northeast Party House - Shelf Life Album (2019) [co-producer]
DZ Deathrays - Still No Change (2019) [co-writer]
Kult Kyss - Rituals (2019) [co-producer]
The Presets & Golden Features - RAKA EP (2019) [co-producer/co-writer]
Slum Sociable - Afterthought (2018) [co-writer]
Golden Features - Falling Out (2018) [co-producer/co-writer]
The Presets - Hi Viz (2018) [co-producer/co-writer]
Zero Percent - Volumes (2018) [co-producer/co-writer]
DMA's - For Now (2018) [producer/co-writer]
Jack Ladder and The Dreamlanders "Playmates" (2014) [producer/co-writer]
Beni – Protect/I Can't Hide EP (2014) [writer/producer]
Beni – Love on the Run/Summer's Gone EP (2013) [writer/producer]
Kirin J Callinan – Embracism (2013) [producer/co-writer]
Forces – Overland (In My Mind) (2012) [mixing]
The Presets - Pacifica (2012) [co-producer/co-writer]
Beni – House of Beni (2011) [co-producer/co-writer]
Beni – Maximus (2009) [producer]
The Presets – Apocalypso (2008) [co-producer/co-writer] 
Digitalism – Pogo (2007) [co-writer]
Lost Valentinos – Miles from Nowhere EP (2007) [producer tracks A1/A2] 
Riot in Belgium – La Musique (2007) [co-writer/mixing/additional production]
PNAU – No More Violence (2007) [co-writer]
Riot in Belgium – The Acid Never Lies (2006) [co-writer, mixing and additional production]
Love Tattoo – Tuff Love (2005) [producer/writer]
The Presets – Beams (2005) [co-producer/co-writer]
The Valentinos/Lost Valentinos – The Valentinos EP (2005) [producer]
Natalie Imbruglia - Satisfied (2005) [drums/glockenspiel]
Decoder Ring – Somersault (OST) (2004) [vibraphone]
Siena – Sway (2004) [producer/co-writer]
The Presets – Girl and the Sea EP (2004) [co-producer]
The Dissociatives - The Dissociatives (2004) [additional production/drums/vibraphone/percussion]
PNAU – Lovers (2003) [co-writer]
The Presets – Blow Up EP (2003) [co-producer]
Coda – There Is a Way to Fly (2003) [vibraphone/percussion/writer]
Prop – Small Craft, Rough Sea (2001) [co-producer/co-writer/vibraphone/percussion]
Powderfinger – The Metre  (2001) [marimba]

Touring
'Selected Jerks 2001–2009' National Launch Tour (October–November 2009) 
National Winter DJ Tour (June–July 2013)

Other appearances
A Bag Raiders Remix of "B.T.T.T.T.R.Y." was featured in the video game Grand Theft Auto IV.

References

External links
K.I.M at Modular Recordings

1976 births
21st-century Australian male musicians
21st-century Australian musicians
21st-century drummers
Australian drummers
Australian house musicians
Australian keyboardists
APRA Award winners
ARIA Award winners
Living people
Male drummers
The Presets members
The Dissociatives members